Siboney is the name and brand of a variety of rums from the Dominican Republic produced by Bodegas Cochón-Calvo, S.A.

History
Originated in Santo Domingo, Dominican Republic in 1920. Siboney was a rum that appears to have been introduced in the United States around the 1930s. The idea behind the rum was to bring in a Cuban rum-master named Señor Alvare to produce a Cuban style rum in the US with Cuban ingredients and knowledge. This way customers would not pay any duty on their purchase, at least this was one of the selling points.

Aging and blending
Rums are aged in white oak casks, previously used for bourbon, with a minimum aging of 14 months for the lower tiers.

Products
Siboney no.34 (sweet rum liquor)
Dorado Superior (golden low-tier)
Blanco Selecto (white low-tier)
Añejo (golden mid-tier)
Reserva Especial (golden high-end premium blend)

Accolades
Siboney rums generally have received modest scores from spirit ratings organizations.  For example, the Blanco and Dorado earned bronze medals from the San Francisco World Spirits Competition. Although the Reserva earned a silver medal from the San Francisco competition, it performed slightly worse at the Beverage Testing Institute (BTI).  BTI gave the Reserva a score of 84, below the scores of 86–87 it gave to the Blanco and Dorado.

References

External links
http://www.therumelier.com/id80.html History of Sibony Rum

Brands of the Dominican Republic
Rums